Kitchell is a surname. Notable people with the surname include:

 Aaron Kitchell (1744–1820), U.S. Representative and Senator
 Abdul Kitchell (born 1916), Hong Kong international lawn bowler
 Alma Kitchell (1893–1996), American concert singer
 Hudson Mindell Kitchell (1862–1944), American artist
 Iva Kitchell (1908–1983), concert dancer
 Sonya Kitchell (born 1989), American jazz singer-songwriter
 Webster Kitchell (1931–2009), theologian
 Wickliffe Kitchell (1789–1869), American politician and lawyer

See also
 Ketchell, surname
 Kitchel, surname
 Kitchell Park, Pana, Illinois